Tunku Ali Redhauddin ibni Tuanku Muhriz (born 26 April 1977) is the eldest son of the reigning Yang di-Pertuan Besar of Negeri Sembilan, Tuanku Muhriz ibni Almarhum Tuanku Munawir. He was granted the title of Tunku Besar (Senior Prince) of Seri Menanti on 23 February 2009 and also a member of the Council of Justice and Law. Besides his official duties, Tunku Ali divides his time between corporate boards, non-profit entities and educational institutions. He was recognised as a Young Global Leader in 2013 by World Economic Forum.

Family 
Tunku Ali Redhauddin was born on 26 April 1977 at University Hospital, Petaling Jaya, Selangor, as elder son and child of Tuanku Muhriz ibni Almarhum Tuanku Munawir (now the reigning Yang di-Pertuan Besar of Negeri Sembilan) and Tuanku Aishah Rohani.

His siblings are :
 Tunku Zain Al-'Abidin (born 6 July 1982).
 Tunku Alif Hussein (born 3 September 1984 – died 15 January 2016).

Career

Corporate 
Tunku Ali started his career in 1988 with McKinsey & Company and worked primarily out of its London, Hong Kong and Singapore offices where he advised governments and large corporations on issues ranging from long-term strategy to organisational and corporate governance. From 2004 until 2010, Tunku Ali was with Khazanah Nasional as Director, Investments where he was actively involved in several significant transformation projects and strategic investments in Malaysia and abroad. From then on, he has taken on multiple corporate positions in various industries. Currently, Tunku Ali chairs two public listed companies - Bumi Armada Berhad and Taliworks Corporation Berhad and sits on a few other boards, including Bangkok Bank and Sun Life Malaysia. Tunku Ali is also Senior Advisor to TPG Capital where he sits on the boards of several TPG portfolio companies.

Non-Profit and other entities 
Tunku Ali is also active in the non-profit sector where he devotes his time towards charitable endeavors and educational entities. He is Chairman and Founding Trustee of Teach For Malaysia, an independent, not-for-profit organisation on a mission to provide all children in Malaysia the opportunity to attain an excellent education. Tunku Ali is the Chairman of the Board of Trustees of Yayasan Munarah, the Negeri Sembilan’s Royal Family Foundation. He is also involved in conservation and heritage preservation efforts as the Chairman of WWF Malaysia and a Trustee of Amanah Warisan Negara.

Ancestry

References

Royal House of Negeri Sembilan
Living people
1977 births
Heirs apparent
People from Negeri Sembilan
Malaysian Muslims
Malaysian people of Malay descent
Malaysian people of Minangkabau descent
People educated at Marlborough College
Alumni of Christ's College, Cambridge
Harvard Kennedy School alumni
Malaysian expatriates in the United States
Sons of monarchs